The upland pipit (Anthus sylvanus) is a species of bird in the family Motacillidae.
It is found in Afghanistan, China, Hong Kong, India, Nepal, and Pakistan.

References

upland pipit
Birds of Pakistan
Birds of North India
Birds of Nepal
Birds of South China
Fauna of Sikkim
upland pipit
upland pipit
Taxonomy articles created by Polbot